John Williams (born 1932) is an American composer (specializing in film scores), conductor and pianist.

John, Johnnie, or Johnny Williams may also refer to:

People

Businessmen 
 John Williams (football executive) (born 1939 or 1940), English football executive
 John Williams (winemaker) (born 1953), American winemaker
 John C. Williams (economist) (born 1962), president and chief executive officer of the Federal Reserve Bank of New York
 John H. Williams (businessperson), American businessperson
 John Henry Williams (baseball) (1968–2004), son of baseball player Ted Williams
 John Osborn Williams (1886–1963), Canadian businessperson
 John P. Williams Jr. (1941–2019), president of the Greater Cincinnati Chamber of Commerce
 John Stanton Williams (1814–1876), American shipowner and businessperson

Clergymen 
 John Williams (Ab Ithel) (1811–1862), Welsh antiquary and Anglican priest
 John Williams (archbishop of York) (1582–1650), British Anglican archbishop of York and political advisor to King James I
 John Williams (archdeacon of Switzerland) (born 1948), Anglican archdeacon of Switzerland
 John Williams (archdeacon of Worcester) (1912–2002), Anglican archdeacon of Dudley and archdeacon of Worcester
 John Williams (bishop of Chichester) (1636–1709), English bishop of Chichester
 John Williams (bishop of Connecticut) (1817–1899), American bishop of Connecticut, presiding bishop of the Episcopal Church, and dean of Berkeley Divinity School
 John Williams (dean of Llandaff) (1907–1983), Welsh Anglican archdeacon of Llandaff and dean of Llandaff
 John Williams (evangelical priest) (1762–1802), Welsh Anglican priest
 John Williams (minister and physician) (1626 or 1627 – 1673), Welsh nonconformist preacher and physician
 John Williams (missionary) (1796–1839), English Congregationalist missionary eaten by cannibals in Vanuatu
 John Williams (New England minister) (1664–1729), New England Puritan minister, famous for The Redeemed Captive
 John Williams (Oxford academic) (died 1613), British Anglican dean of Bangor, principal of Jesus College, Oxford, and vice-chancellor of the University of Oxford
 John Williams (priest, born 1792) (1792–1858), Welsh Anglican archdeacon of Cardigan, scholar, and schoolmaster 
 John Williams (schoolmaster, born 1760) (1760–1826), Welsh Anglican priest and schoolmaster
 John Albert Williams (1866–1933), American Episcopal priest, journalist, and political activist
 Chris Williams (bishop) (John Christopher Richard Williams, born 1936), Anglican bishop in Canada
 John Elias Williams (1871–1927), American Presbyterian missionary to China
 John Joseph Williams (1822–1907), American Roman Catholic archbishop of Boston
 John Owen Williams (Pedrog) (1853–1932), Welsh Congregationalist minister and poet
 John Tudno Williams (born 1938), moderator of the Presbyterian Church of Wales and principal of United Theological College, Aberystwyth

Criminals and alleged criminals 
 John Williams (British mass murderer) (1774–1811), perpetrator of the Ratcliff Highway murders
 John Williams (convict), convict transported to Van Diemen's Land (now Tasmania)
 John Williams (died 1913), murder convict in the Case of the Hooded Man
 John Allen Williams (murderer) or John Allen Muhammad (1960–2009), American murderer
 Johnny Madison Williams Jr. (born 1951), bank robber

Judges 
 John Williams (English judge) (died 1846), known for the 1830s Tolpuddle Martyr trials
 John A. Williams (judge) (1835–1900), US federal judge
 John Griffith Williams (born 1944), Welsh judge of the High Court of England and Wales
 Hugh Williams (judge) (John Hugh Williams, born 1939), New Zealand judge
 B. John Williams (born 1949), American lawyer and judge

Military figures

American military figures 
 John Williams (Medal of Honor, born 1828) (1828–1886), American Civil War sailor and Medal of Honor recipient
 John Williams (Medal of Honor, born 1832) (1832–?), American Civil War sailor and Medal of Honor recipient
 John Williams (Medal of Honor, 1861) (1831–1899), American sailor and Medal of Honor recipient
 John B. Williams (general), United States Air Force general
 John F. Williams (1887–1953), Army National Guard general
 John Foster Williams (1743–1814), Continental Navy officer during the American Revolutionary War
 John G. Williams Jr. (1924–1991), US Navy admiral
 John J. Williams (soldier) (1843–1865), Union soldier, last battle fatality during the American Civil War
 John Pugh Williams (1750s–1803), American Revolution general
 John Stuart Williams (1818–1898), Confederate general in the American Civil War, later US senator from Kentucky

British military figures 
 John Williams (British Army officer) (1934–2002), British army officer
 John Williams (VC) (1857–1932), recipient of the Victoria Cross
 Jack Williams (VC) (John Henry Williams, 1886–1953), Welsh recipient of the Victoria Cross
 John Lloyd Williams (RAF officer) (1894–?), World War I fighter ace
 Sir John William Collman Williams (1823–1911), Royal Marines officer
 John Williams Wilson (1798–1857), English-Chilean sailor and politician

Other military figures 
 John Edwin Ashley Williams (1919–1944), Australian air force officer, murdered in 1944 following "The Great Escape"
 John Scott Williams (1893–1944), Canadian military officer and aviator

Musicians
 John Williams (bassist) (born 1941), American jazz double bassist, bass guitarist
 John Williams (guitarist) (born 1941), Australian classical guitarist
 John Williams (pianist) (1929–2018), American jazz pianist
 John B (John Bryn Williams, born 1977), English disc jockey
 John David (musician) (John David Williams, born 1946), Welsh pop and rock musician and songwriter
 John Gary Williams, American R&B singer and member of The Mad Lads
 John McLaughlin Williams (born 1957), American classical conductor and violinist
 John Overton Williams (1905–1996), American jazz saxophonist with Andy Kirk
 John Owen Williams (record producer) (born 1951), English A&R executive, record producer and songwriter
 Johnny Williams (bassist) (1908–1998), American jazz double bassist
 Johnny Williams (blues musician) (1906–2006), Chicago blues guitarist and singer
 Johnny Williams (drummer) (1905–1985), American jazz drummer with the Raymond Scott Quintette
 Johnny Williams (saxophonist) (1936–1998), American saxophonist with Count Basie
 "Scarface" John Williams (1938–1972), singer

Physicians 
 John Williams (gastroenterologist), British clinical academic researcher
 Sir John Williams, 1st Baronet, of the City of London (1840–1926), physician to Queen Victoria
 John Ralston Williams (1874–1965), Canadian-American physician
 John Whitridge Williams (1866–1931), obstetrician at Johns Hopkins Hospital

Politicians

American politicians 
 John Williams (Caswell County, North Carolina) (1740–1804), North Carolina state senator
 John Williams (Continental Congress) (1731–1799), North Carolina delegate to Continental Congress
 John Williams (Pitt County, North Carolina) (1735–1789), American revolutionary from North Carolina, served in state Assembly and House of Commons 
 John Williams (Rochester, New York) (1807–1875), US representative from New York
 John Williams (Salem, New York) (1752–1806), US representative from New York
 John Williams (Tennessee politician) (1778–1837), US senator from Tennessee
 John Williams (West Virginia politician) (born 1990), West Virginia state delegate
 John Bell Williams (1918–1983), US Representative from Mississippi
 John Cornelius Williams Jr. (born 1938), American politician in the state of South Carolina
 Thomas Edward Williams (politician)  (1849–1931), Wisconsin legislator, erroneously named John Edward Williams in the 1885 Wisconsin Blue Book
 John F. Williams (American politician) (1885–1963), New York state senator
 John Green Williams (1796–1833), Virginia lawyer and delegate
 John J. Williams (politician) (1904–1988), US senator from Delaware
 John K. Williams (1822–1880), member of the Wisconsin State Assembly
 John M. S. Williams (1818–1886), US representative from Massachusetts
 Pat Williams (Montana politician) (John Patrick Williams, born 1937), US representative from Montana
 John R. Williams (1782–1854), mayor of Detroit
 Jack Williams (American politician) (John Richard Williams, 1909–1998), three-time governor of Arizona
 John Sharp Williams (1854–1932), US representative and senator from Mississippi
 John Skelton Williams (1865–1926), US Comptroller of the Currency (1914–21)
 John Stuart Williams (1818–1898), US senator from Kentucky, former Confederate general
 John T. Williams (politician) (1864–1944), Wisconsin state assemblyman
 John Willis Williams, state legislator in Arkansas

Australian politicians 
 John Williams (Australian senator) (born 1955), Australian senator from New South Wales
 John Williams (New South Wales colonial politician) (1821–1891), member of the New South Wales Legislative Council
 John Williams (New South Wales state politician) (born 1948), member of the New South Wales Legislative Assembly
 John Williams (South Australian politician) (1824–1890), pastoralist and member of the South Australian House of Assembly
 John Williams (Western Australian politician) (1926–1997), member of the Legislative Council of Western Australia

British politicians 
 John Williams (MP for Bedford) ( – ), sat 1554–55
 John Williams, 1st Baron Williams of Thame (1500–1559), Lord Chamberlain
 John Williams (MP for Dorset) (c. 1545–1617), English member of parliament (MP) for Dorset, 1604
 Sir John Williams, 2nd Baronet, of Llangibby (1651–1704), MP for Monmouth Boroughs and Monmouthshire, 1698–1705
 Sir John Williams, 2nd Baronet, of Eltham (1653–1723), MP for Herefordshire, 1701–1705
 John Williams (Wales MP), Welsh politician who sat in the House of Commons in 1653
 Sir John Williams (died 1743), MP for Aldeburgh, 1730–1734
 John Williams (died 1751), MP for Fowey, 1701–1702
 John Williams (Macclesfield MP) (died 1855), MP for Macclesfield, 1847–1852
 John Williams (born 1736) (1736–?), MP for Saltash, 1771
 John Williams (Windsor MP) (1766–?), MP for Windsor, 1802–1804
 John Williams (1777–1846), MP for Lincoln, 1822–1826, Ilchester, 1826–1827, and Winchelsea, 1830–1832
 John Williams (Nottinghamshire politician) (1821–1907), MP for Nottingham South (1885) and Mansfield (1892–1890)
 Sir John Williams, 1st Baronet, of the City of London (1840–1926), royal physician
 Jack Williams (socialist activist) (John Edward Williams, 1854–1917), British socialist and unemployed movement activist
 John Charles Williams (1861–1939), MP for Truro, 1892–1895
 John Williams (Gower MP) (1861–1922), MP for Gower 1906–1922
 John Henry Williams (politician) (1870–1936), MP for Llanelli 1922–1936
 John Williams (trade unionist) (born 1873), British trade unionist and politician
 John Williams (Glasgow politician) (1892–1982), British MP for Glasgow Kelvingrove
 John L. Williams (Welsh nationalist) (1924–2004), Plaid Cymru councillor and language campaigner
 John Williams (MP for Weymouth and Melcombe Regis), MP for Weymouth and Melcombe Regis

Canadian politicians 
 John Williams (Manitoba politician) (1860–1931), Canadian politician
 John Elliot Williams (1920–1988), Canadian politician and boat builder
 John G. Williams (Canadian politician) (born 1946), member of Parliament for Edmonton—St. Albert, Alberta
 John Reesor Williams (born 1930), member of the Ontario Legislature 
 John Tucker Williams (1789–1854), Canadian political figure
 John William Williams (Canadian politician), Member of the Legislative Assembly of British Columbia for Victoria City

Other politicians 
 Jack Williams (New Zealand politician) (John Henry Williams, 1919–1975), Labour Party member of parliament
 John Kenneth Williams, Pakistani senator
 John William Williams (1827–1904), New Zealand politician from Northland
 John Williams (Jamaican politician), Jamaican planter, slave-owner and politician

Scholars 
 John Williams (Ab Ithel) (1811–1862), Welsh antiquary and Anglican priest
 John Williams (art historian) (1928–2015), University of Pittsburgh
 John Williams (bishop of Connecticut) (1817–1899), American bishop of Connecticut, presiding bishop of the Episcopal Church, and dean of Berkeley Divinity School
 John Williams (gastroenterologist), British clinical academic researcher
 John Williams (Oxford academic) (died 1613), British Anglican dean of Bangor, principal of Jesus College, Oxford, and vice-chancellor of the University of Oxford
 John Williams (priest, born 1792) (1792–1858), Welsh Anglican archdeacon of Cardigan, scholar, and schoolmaster 
 John Williams (water scientist), member of the Wentworth Group of Concerned Scientists
 John Williams Jr. (university president), former and 12th president of Muhlenberg College
 John Allen Williams (born 1945), American political scientist
 John Beaumont Williams (1932–2005), Australian botanist
 John Burr Williams (1900–1989), early finance theorist; author of The Theory of Investment Value (1938)
 John Davis Williams (1902–1983), chancellor of the University of Mississippi, 1946–1968
 John Ffowcs Williams (1935–2020), professor of engineering at the University of Cambridge, former Master of Emmanuel College
 John Harry Williams (1908–1966), Canadian-American physicist
 John Henry Williams (economist) (1887–1980), American economist
 John Tudno Williams (born 1938), moderator of the Presbyterian Church of Wales and principal of United Theological College, Aberystwyth

Sportsmen

Association footballers 
 John Williams (footballer, born 1901) (1901–?), English professional footballer
 John Williams (footballer, born 1960), English footballer
 John Williams (footballer, born 1968), English footballer
 Johnny Williams (footballer, born 1947) (1947–2021), English footballer
 Johnny Williams (footballer, born 1935) (1935–2011), English footballer
 Jonny Williams, Wales international footballer

Australian rules footballers 
 John Williams (Australian footballer, born 1940) (1940–2019), Australian footballer for Carlton
 John Williams (Australian footballer, born 1947), Australian footballer for Essendon and Collingwood
 John Williams (Australian footballer, born 1988), Australian footballer for Essendon

Baseball players 
 John Williams (first baseman) (1922–1973), American Negro leagues baseball player
 John Williams (pitcher) (born 1904; death unknown), American Negro leagues baseball player
 Johnnie Williams (baseball) (1889–1963), Major League Baseball pitcher
 Johnny Williams (baseball) (born 1916), American Negro leagues baseball player

Cricketers 
 John Williams (Auckland cricketer) (1941–2007), New Zealand cricketer
 John Williams (Canterbury cricketer) (born 1931), New Zealand cricketer
 John Williams (cricketer, born 1878) (1878–1915), English cricketer
 John Williams (cricketer, born 1911) (1911–1964), English cricketer
 John Williams (cricketer, born 1980), English cricketer

Gridiron football players and coaches 
 John Williams (defensive back) (born 1942), American-born player of Canadian football
 John Williams (offensive lineman) (1945–2012), American football player
 John Williams (running back) (born 1960), American football player
 John Williams Jr. (Canadian football) (born 1977), Canadian football running back
 John L. Williams (American football) (born 1964), American football player
 John M. Williams (1935–2021), American football coach
 Johnny Williams (American football) (1927–2005), American football player

Rugby players 
 John Williams (rugby league, born 1985), Australian rugby league footballer
 John Williams (rugby league, born 1907) (1907–?), rugby league footballer of the 1930s for Wales and Rochdale Hornets
 John Williams (rugby union, born 1940), Australian rugby union player
 John Williams (rugby union, born 1946), South African rugby union player and coach
 Jack Williams (rugby union) (John Frederick Williams, 1882–1911), Wales international rugby union lock forward
 J. J. Williams (rugby union) (John James Williams, 1948–2020), Wales international rugby union winger
 J. P. R. Williams (John Peter Rhys Williams, born 1949), Wales international rugby union fullback
 Johnny Williams (rugby union, born 1882) (1882–1916), Wales international rugby union winger
 Johnny Williams (rugby union, born 1982), English rugby union player
 Johnny Williams (rugby union, born 1996), Wales international rugby union centre

Other sportsmen 
 John Williams (archer) (born 1953), American archer
 John Williams (basketball, born 1966), American basketball player
 John Williams (equestrian) (born 1965), American equestrian
 John Williams (mixed martial artist) (born 1940), Canadian martial artist known as Gray Wolf
 John Williams (motorcyclist) (1946–1978), English Grand Prix motorcycle racer
 John Williams (snooker referee) (born 1937), Welsh snooker referee
 Ian Rotten (John Benson Williams, born 1970), American wrestler
 John "Hot Rod" Williams (1962–2015), American basketball player
 John Sherman Williams (born 1963), American basketball player
 Johnny Williams (boxer) (1926–2007), Welsh boxer

Writers 
 John Williams (author, born 1961), Welsh novelist
 John Williams (satirist) (1761–1818), English poet, satirist, and journalist
 John A. Williams (1925–2015), American novelist
 Sir John Bickerton Williams, English nonconformist author and lawyer
 John Edward Williams (1922–1994), American author, editor and professor, known for novels Augustus Bucther's Crossing and Stoner
 John Ellis Williams (1924–2008), Welsh novelist
 John Francon Williams (1854–1911), Welsh journalist, writer, geographer, historian, cartographer and inventor
 John Hartley Williams (1942–2014), English poet
 John James Williams (poet) (1869–1954), Welsh poet
 John Richard Williams (poet) (1867–1924), Welsh poet, also known as J. R. Tryfanwy
 John Sibley Williams (born 1978), American poet and fiction writer

Others 
 Sir John Williams (shipbuilder) (1700–1784) ship designer to the Royal Navy
 John Williams, engineer of the Montgomery Canal
 John Williams (actor) (1903–1983), English stage, film, and television actor
 John Williams (barrister) (1757–1810), Welsh barrister and legal writer
 John Williams (radio personality) (born 1959), American radio personality
 John Williams (goldsmith), Welsh-born goldsmith based in London
 John Constantine Williams Sr. (died 1892), cofounder of St. Petersburg, Florida
 John Eddie Williams, American attorney
 John G. Williams (ornithologist) (1913–1997), Welsh ornithologist
 John H. Williams (film producer) (born 1953), film producer
 Grant Williams (actor) (John Joseph Williams, 1931–1985), American actor
 J. Lloyd Williams (1854–1945), botanist, author, and musician
 John T. Williams (woodcarver) (1960–2010), Native American woodcarver and shooting victim
 John W. Williams (legislative clerk)  (1869–1934), American lawyer, clerk of the Virginia House of Delegates

Other 
 List of ships named John Williams

See also 
 J. J. Williams (disambiguation)
 John Williams House (disambiguation)
 John William (disambiguation)
 Jack Williams (disambiguation)
 John A. Williams (disambiguation)
 John B. Williams (disambiguation)
 John C. Williams (disambiguation)
 John D. Williams (disambiguation)
 John E. Williams (disambiguation)
 John F. Williams (disambiguation)
 John G. Williams (disambiguation)
 John H. Williams (disambiguation)
 John Henry Williams (disambiguation)
 John J. Williams (disambiguation)
 John L. Williams (disambiguation)
 John Lloyd Williams (disambiguation)
 John M. Williams (disambiguation)
 John O. Williams (disambiguation)
 John Owen Williams (disambiguation)
 John P. Williams (disambiguation)
 John R. Williams (disambiguation)
 John Richard Williams (disambiguation)
 John S. Williams (disambiguation)
 John T. Williams (disambiguation)
 John W. Williams (disambiguation)
 Jonathan Williams (disambiguation)
 Sir John Williams, 1st Baronet (disambiguation)
 John Williamson (disambiguation)